Fèves au lard, also called bines or haricots au lard, is a traditional Québécois dish. It is usually beans mixed with pieces of bacon and either molasses or maple syrup that is then slow cooked in the oven. Sometimes other ingredients are added. Fèves au lard are usually served as a side during breakfast, but they can also be served as a side during lunch or supper and they can be served as a meal. Fèves au lard is a traditional dish presented at sugar shacks during le temps des sucres in Québec and other French-speaking regions of Canada.

This dish was inspired by cultural exchanges between Québécois and New Englanders during the 19th century. It is believed that Boston baked beans directly inspired Fèves au lard.  It is also thought that this popular recipe, which uses small white beans, was what caused the gourgane bean to fall out of favour in Québec.

Bineries
Some establishments call themselves "Bineries" because they consider Fèves au lard and other baked bean dishes a specialty of theirs. An example of this is La Binerie Mont-Royal, a restaurant in Montréal.

Gallery

See also
 Cuisine of Quebec
 Sugar shack

References

Web references

Bibliography
Jean-Marie Francœur, Genèse de la cuisine québécoise. À travers ses grandes et ses petites histoires, Montréal, Fides, 2011, 608 p., p. 349–356.

Cuisine of Quebec
Culture of Quebec
Baked beans
Food made from maple
Molasses
Legume dishes
Canadian cuisine